The word Processus may refer to:
In the field of Anatomy, processus is Latin for process, which is an outgrowth of tissue
 Processus (Kingdom of Hungary), small administrative units of the Kingdom of Hungary
 Saint Processus

sk:Slúžnovský okres